La Tragedia del Vaquero (The Tragedy of the Cowboy) is a studio album released by Mexican singer Vicente Fernández on November 14, 2006 by Sony Music.

Track listing

References

External links
  official website Vicente Fernández
 [] La Tragedia del Vaquero on allmusic.com
  La Tragedia del Vaquero on itunes.apple.com

 

 
2006 albums
Vicente Fernández albums
Spanish-language albums
Sony BMG Norte albums